Golam Kabir (born 24 December 1988) is a Bangladeshi first-class cricketer who plays for Barisal Division.

See also
 List of Barisal Division cricketers

References

External links
 

1988 births
Living people
Bangladeshi cricketers
Barisal Division cricketers
Partex Sporting Club cricketers
People from Barisal